Creag Bheag is a prominent hill in Scotland.

Etymology

The word Creag is a variation of crag (rock), while the gaelic term Bheag can be transalted as small.

Features 

The hill overlooks from NW the centre of Kingussie; its E flanks are bordered by the Gynack Burn, a left-hand tributary of River Spey, and the N face dominates the Loch Gynack. The hilltop is marked by a cairn, as well as a nearby S summit almost at the same elevation of the main summit. Because of its topographic prominence the hill is classified as a Marilyn.

History 
Due to the easy access and the good panorama from its summit the Creag Behag has always been a popular walk. In 1828 some young men of Kingussie erected a memorial cairn, now disappeared, in order to mourn the loss of Alexander, the 4th Duke of Gordon. For the occasion a crowd of people reached the hilltop accompanied by a band of musicians playing their instruments.

Access to the summit 
The ascent to Creag Behag from Kingussie is considered a classic hillwalk, apreciated for the panoramic view from the hilltop on the surrounding area. The hike runs on well maintained and waymarked footpaths .

Nature conservation 
The hill, along with the surrounding area, is part of the Cairngorms National Park.

References

Panorama 

Marilyns of Scotland
Kingussie
Mountains and hills of Highland (council area)
Mountains and hills of the Cairngorms